The 1977 Indian general election polls in Tamil Nadu were held for 39 seats in the state. The result was a big victory for Indian National Congress under Indira Gandhi and its allies All India Anna Dravida Munnetra Kazhagam and Communist Party of India winning 34 seats, while Janata Party and its allies Dravida Munnetra Kazhagam and Indian National Congress (Organisation) won only 5 seats. The Janata Party ended up winning this election. After the election, the AIADMK ended up supporting the Janata Party under Morarji Desai. In 1979, AIADMK continued to support Janata Party, by supporting Charan Singh, which resulted in the appointment of two AIADMK cabinet members.

Voting and results

Results by Pre-poll Alliance

Results by Post-poll Alliance

List of Elected MPs

Post-election Union Council of Ministers from Tamil Nadu
While there were no members from Tamil Nadu in Morarji Desai's Administration, Charan Singh appointed two AIADMK members to his cabinet, making it the first time a non-Congress Dravidian Party member making it to the council of ministers at the national level.

Cabinet Ministers (Charan Singh Administration)

See also 
Elections in Tamil Nadu

References

Bibliography 
Volume I, 1977 Indian general election, 6th Lok Sabha

External links
 Website of Election Commission of India
 CNN-IBN Lok Sabha Election History

1977 Indian general election
Indian general elections in Tamil Nadu
1970s in Tamil Nadu